Kalbe Jawad  is a Shia Muslim cleric from Lucknow, India. Imam-e-Juma (leader of the Friday prayers) at the Shahi Asafi Mosque, Lucknow

Positions and activities

He has held following positions:
 Imam-e-Juma (leader of the Friday prayers) at the Shahi Asafi Mosque, Lucknow.
 Senior member of All India Muslim Personal Law Board.
 Patron & chairman of the committee of "Shia Orphanage" Gulistan-e-Abutalib a.s., Lucknow.
 Member of the "Joint Ulema Council", founded after 19 February 2006.
 National President Rashtriya Shia Sufi Sangh
 General Secretary Majlis e Ulama e Hind

In June 2000 he founded an organization named Tanzeem-e-Pasdaran-e-Husain (a.s.).

Involvement in Azadari movement of Lucknow
He have been involved in azadari movement protests since 1980s, and subsequently led vigorous anti-government demonstrations at Lucknow in 1997 to lift two decades old ban on Azadari processions in Lucknow. He got arrested two times during the movement:
 He with Sunni clerics Maulana Qamar Minai and Imam Bukhari of Delhi were arrested on 3 June 1997 for organising a meeting and defying Section 144 I.P.C.
 He was again arrested on 28 June 1997 at 4:00 a.m. under National Security Act (NSA).

The government later entered into a tripartite Shias-Sunnis-Administration agreement and nine main processions on the 1st, 7th, 8th, 9th, 10th Muharrum, Chehlum, 8th Rabiul Awwal and 21st Ramzan have been restored.

Involvement in Waqf movement of Lucknow
The "Waqf Movement" or Tehreek-e-Awqaf which is going on in Lucknow under his leadership has achieved significant success in Lucknow and Delhi (with Dargah e Shah Mardan case). He has been demanding CBI inquiry into the corruption taken place in UP Shia Central Waqf Board from a very long time. So far the governments have given assurance only.
He founded of noore hidayat foundation lucknow.

Involvement in demonstrations and rallies
He held an anti US/Israel/Denmark rally at Lucknow which was attended by over one million people.

Wahhabism and Jews
In the same interview Jawad compared practitioners of Wahhabism in Saudi Arabia to Jews, stating that: "This is the path of the Jews. According to their Talmud, none but the Jews have the right to live. The Jewish mentality and the Wahhabi mentality are one and the same. That is why we say that there is no difference between the Saudis and the Jews. Their policies are the same, and they support one another. In fact, the Jews are their patrons."

References

External links
 
 Pasdarane Husain - Website of an organisation run by Maulana Syed Kalbe Jawwad
 An article entitled "Who is Kalbe Jawwad"

Living people
21st-century Muslim scholars of Islam
Scholars from Lucknow
Indian Shia Muslims
Shia scholars of Islam
Indian Islamic religious leaders
Indian Shia clerics
Ijtihadi family
1966 births